Placenta specific 8 is a protein that in humans is encoded by the PLAC8 gene.

References

Further reading